Robert Mitsuhiro Takasugi (September 12, 1930 – August 4, 2009) was a United States district judge of the United States District Court for the Central District of California.

Early life

Takasugi was born in Tacoma, Washington. When he was 12 years old, he and his family were interned in the Tule Lake War Relocation Center, part of the World War II internment of 130,000 Japanese Americans resulting from the enforcement of Executive Order 9066. After the war, Takasugi attended Belmont High School in Los Angeles.

Education 
In 1953, Takasugi earned a Bachelor of Science degree from the University of California, Los Angeles. In 1959, Takasugi earned a Juris Doctor degree from the USC Gould School of Law.

Career
Takasugi was a Corporal in the United States Army during the Korean War, from 1953 to 1955, acting as a criminal investigator for the Army. After law school, he entered private practice in Los Angeles, California from 1960 to 1973. He was a hearing examiner for the Los Angeles Police Commission from 1962 to 1965. He was appointed by Governor Ronald Reagan as a judge of the Los Angeles Municipal Court from 1973 to 1975, and elevated by Governor Jerry Brown to the Los Angeles County Superior Court from 1975 to 1976.

Federal judicial 
On April 14, 1976, Takasugi was nominated by President Gerald Ford to a seat on the United States District Court for the Central District of California vacated by Judge Elisha Avery Crary. Takasugi was confirmed by the United States Senate on May 6, 1976, and received his commission the following day. Takasugi was the first Japanese American appointed as a federal judge.  Takasugi assumed senior status on September 30, 1996, and took inactive senior status in April 2009.

Personal life 
Takasugi's wife was Dorothy Takasugi. They have two children. Takasugi is succeeded by his two chilrden and grandchildren, Kinuyo Takasugi and Matthew Takasugi. 
On August 4, 2009, Takasugi died in Los Angeles, California.

See also
List of Asian American jurists

References

External links 
 
 Robert Takasugi at ballotpedia.org
 Robert Takasugi at bloomberg.com

1930 births
2009 deaths
American military personnel of Japanese descent
American jurists of Japanese descent
California state court judges
Japanese-American internees
Judges of the United States District Court for the Central District of California
People from Tacoma, Washington
Superior court judges in the United States
United States district court judges appointed by Gerald Ford
20th-century American judges
Belmont High School (Los Angeles) alumni
University of California, Los Angeles alumni
USC Gould School of Law alumni